Cottle Creek is a stream in the U.S. state of South Dakota.

Cottle Creek has the name of Frank Cottle, a pioneer merchant.

See also
List of rivers of South Dakota

References

Rivers of Meade County, South Dakota
Rivers of South Dakota